Saonara is a comune (municipality) in the Province of Padua in the Italian region Veneto, located about  southwest of Venice and about  southeast of Padua.

Saonara borders the following municipalities: Legnaro, Padua, Sant'Angelo di Piove di Sacco, Vigonovo.

Demographic evolution

External links
 Official site of Saint Martin Bishop Parish in Saonara.

References

Cities and towns in Veneto